Catherine Isabella "Kate" Barmby (née Watkins; 1816/1817 – 26 December 1853) was an English utopian socialist and writer on women's emancipation. She was the daughter of Bridstock Watkins and belonged to the lower-middle class. Little is known of her early life or education, but her instruction allowed her to become a writer and lecturer. She wrote several articles for the Owenite socialist newspaper New Moral World on feminist demands and her Millennialist beliefs. She was married to the socialist Goodwyn Barmby.

Articles 
Watkins was first published In the New Moral World in 1835 under the pen-name Kate and continued writing for this journal for more than five years. The New Moral World  was the official journal of the Owenite movement and was first issued in December 1834 after its predecessor The Pioneer ceased publication in July 1834. Her articles reflected the general Owenite feminist concerns at the time, such as women's reduced access to employment or the danger that private property supposes for family life as well as explanations and reflections on Robert Owen's views.

References 

Utopian socialists
English socialists
1810s births
1853 deaths
English non-fiction writers
English women non-fiction writers
English feminist writers
Owenites
English socialist feminists
19th-century women writers